The Stuart–Landau equation describes the behavior of a nonlinear oscillating system near the Hopf bifurcation, named after John Trevor Stuart and Lev Landau. In 1944, Landau proposed an equation for the evolution of the magnitude of the disturbance, which is now called as the Landau equation, to explain the transition to turbulence based on a phenomenological argument and an attempt to derive this equation from hydrodynamic equations was done by Stuart for plane Poiseuille flow in 1958. The formal derivation to derive the Landau equation was given by Stuart, Watson and Palm in 1960. The perturbation in the vicinity of bifurcation is governed by the following equation

where 
 is a complex quantity describing the disturbance,
 is the complex growth rate,

Here the real part of the growth rate is taken to be positive, i.e.,  because otherwise the system is stable in the linear sense, that is to say, for infinitesimal disturbances ( is a small number), the nonlinear term in the above equation is negligible in comparison to the other two terms in which case the amplitude grows in time only if . The Landau constant is also taken to be positive,  because otherwise the amplitude will grow indefinitely (see below equations and the general solution in the next section). The Landau equation is the equation for the magnitude of the disturbance,

which can also be re-written as

Similarly, the equation for the phase is given by

Due to the universality of the equation, the equation finds its application in many fields such as hydrodynamic stability, Belousov–Zhabotinsky reaction, etc.

General solution

The Landau equation is linear when it is written for the dependent variable ,

As , the magnitude of the disturbance  approaches a constant value that is independent of its initial value, i.e.,  when . The associated solution for the phase function  is given by

As , the phase varies linearly with time, 

The growth rate  is negative when  and is positive when  and therefore in the neighbourhood , it may written as  wherein the constant is positive. Thus, the limiting amplitude is given by

Negative Landau constant
When the Landau constant is negative, we must include a negative term of higher order to arrest the unbounded increase of the perturbation. In this case, the Landau equation becomes

The limiting amplitude then becomes

where the plus sign corresponds to the stable branch and the minus sign to the unstable branch. There exists a value of a critical value  where the above two roots are equal such that , indicating that the flow in the region  is metastable, that is to say, in the metastable region, the flow is stable to infinitesimal perturbations, but not to finite amplitude perturbations.

See also
Landau's phase transition theory
Ginzburg–Landau theory

References

Fluid dynamics
Mechanics
Lev Landau